Presidential elections were held in Kiribati on 30 September 1994. The result was a victory for Teburoro Tito, who won 51.1% of the vote.

Results

References

Kiribati
1994 in Kiribati
Presidential elections in Kiribati
Election and referendum articles with incomplete results